Microtriatoma is a genus of bugs that belongs to the subfamily Triatominae.

2 species:
M. borbai (Lent & Wygodzinsky, 1979 (Tc))
M. trinidadensis (Lent, 1951)

(Tc) means associated with Trypanosoma cruzi

References 

Reduviidae
Cimicomorpha genera